Børge Frederiksen is a former Danish badminton player. He won the All England Championship in men's doubles in 1948 with Preben Dabelsteen. In 1950 he reached the final with Poul Holm. He also won two Danish Championship titles in doubles - in 1943 with Jesper Bie and in 1949 with Tage Madsen and played on the national team until the beginning of the 1950s.

Medal Record at the All England Badminton Championships

References

Danish male badminton players